The 2008 Women's Bandy World Championship took place in Borlänge, Grängesberg and Karlsbyheden, Sweden, between 13 and 16 February. It was the fourth Women's Bandy World Championship in bandy. Sweden won the final against Russia 5-2 and became world champions for the fourth time. Finland won the bronze final 5-3 against Norway.

Participating teams

Venues

Results

Table

Finals

Medals

References

World Championship
2008
Women's World Championship,2008
Bandy World Championship
February 2008 sports events in Europe
Sport in Borlänge
Sports competitions in Dalarna County